František Lízna (11 July 1941 – 4 March 2021) was a Czech Jesuit priest.

Biography
He was born in a Moravian town Jevíčko to Ukrainian mother and Czech father. He was a recipient of the Order of Tomáš Garrigue Masaryk.

He died on 4 March 2021 due to COVID-19 during the COVID-19 pandemic in the Czech Republic in Olomouc hospital.

References

1941 births
2021 deaths
Czech Jesuits
Czech people of Ukrainian descent
Recipients of the Order of Tomáš Garrigue Masaryk
Charter 77 signatories
People from Jevíčko
Deaths from the COVID-19 pandemic in the Czech Republic